Hard Rock Treasures is a documentary film about Don "The Indiana Jones of Rock 'n' Roll" Bernstine from Hard Rock Cafe, when he visits musicians to try to get memorabilia from them.

Some of the memorabilia he gets includes Freddie Mercury's stage pants, the Gibson guitar Tony Iommi used on the first four Black Sabbath albums, the car James Hetfield drives in the video for Metallica's song "I Disappear", Slipknot's stage masks, the bass guitar Michael Anthony used on the recording of Van Halen's 1984 album and a drum Ian Paice used on the recording for Deep Purple's Perfect Strangers album.

The scenes with Dimebag Darrell at his home was shot just months before he was murdered on stage, playing with Damageplan.

Cast
 Don Bernstine
 Rita Gilligan (first waitress at Hard Rock Cafe in London)
 Michael Anthony (Van Halen, Sammy Hagar)
 Jeff Beck (The Yardbirds, The Jeff Beck Group)
 Peter Criss (Kiss)
 Dimebag Darrell (Pantera, Damageplan)
 K.K. Downing (Judas Priest)
 John Entwistle (The Who)
 Peter Frampton (Humble Pie, The Herd)
 Ace Frehley (Kiss, Frehley's Comet)
 Rob Halford (Judas Priest, Halford, Fight, 2wo)
 Tom Hamilton (Aerosmith)
 James Hetfield (Metallica)
 Sarah Hodgson (Christie's, London)
 Tony Iommi (Black Sabbath)
 Brian Johnson (Geordie, AC/DC)
 Kerry King (Slayer)
 Joey Kramer (Aerosmith)
 Dave Kushner (Velvet Revolver)
 James Lott (producer on Sun Studios, Memphis)
 Mike Love (The Beach Boys)
 Duff McKagan (Guns N' Roses, Velvet Revolver)
 Scotty Moore (Elvis Presley)
 Vince Neil (Mötley Crüe)
 Rick Nielsen (Cheap Trick)
 Jimmy Page (Led Zeppelin)
 Ian Paice (Deep Purple, Whitesnake)
 Matt Roberts (3 Doors Down)
 James Root (Stone Sour, Slipknot)
 Richie Sambora (Bon Jovi)
 Gene Simmons (Kiss)
 Nikki Sixx (Mötley Crüe)
 Chad Smith (Red Hot Chili Peppers)
 Matt Sorum (The Cult, Guns N' Roses, Velvet Revolver)
 Paul Stanley (Kiss)
 Corey Taylor (Stone Sour, Slipknot)
 Tommy Thayer (Kiss, Black N' Blue)
 Glenn Tipton (Judas Priest)
 Scott Weiland (Stone Temple Pilots, Velvet Revolver)
 Brian Wilson (The Beach Boys)
 Zakk Wylde (Ozzy Osbourne, Black Label Society)
 James Young (Styx)

Soundtrack
 3 Doors Down - "Let Me Go"
 AC/DC - "Hells Bells"
 Aerosmith - "The Other Side"
 Black Sabbath - "Paranoid"
 Bon Jovi - "Wanted Dead or Alive"
 Cheap Trick - "Dream Police"
 Deep Purple - "Smoke on the Water"
 Elvis Presley - "That's All Right (Mama)"
 Kiss - "Detroit Rock City"
 Kiss - "I Want You"
 Led Zeppelin - "Whole Lotta Love"
 Metallica - "I Disappear"
 Mötley Crüe - "Kickstart My Heart"
 Red Hot Chili Peppers - "Give It Away"
 Styx - "Miss America"
 The Knack - "My Sharona"
 Van Halen - "Jump"
 Velvet Revolver - "Slither"

External links
 

2005 films
Rockumentaries
American documentary films
2000s English-language films
2000s American films